Step stools are half way between a ladder and a stool, being used, as a support platform, for reaching targets that are at heights between ~2m and ~3m. The most common modern type is made with two separate ladders connected to each other at the upper end, where there is a platform with an area big enough to stand with both feet on it, having the rest of steps the same area, but not in all models, for some step stools have classical ladder steps. This folding design arrangement eliminates the need for a fixed support on a wall, as in the case of a standard ladder. They are widely used in the kitchen, to the point that in some places they are called "kitchen ladder".

Evolution 
From the small wooden stool, the Step stool grew to allow grabbing objects from higher places. The need led to the addition of a couple of steps, first of wood and then of light metal. The multi-step ones are also equipped with safety railings for the taller models. They are usually foldable so that they can be easily stored and transported. 

To meet the needs of construction professionals, Step stools have been redesigned for very specific uses such as scaffold ladders, giraffe ladders, etc. .

Uses 

Step stools have a wide range of uses, being an important aid for working at home. The ones with a wide platform, they are very practical for wall  painters, who can even walk on the platform without having to go up&down every time they need to change their work area a few inches. They are used, for example, to change light bulbs and fluorescent lights in rooms with high ceilings, to pick fruit in horticulture and other activities. They are also used by photographers when they need a higher overall viewing point. Some models can be used as a sitting stool.   

They are suitable only for use on floors with a flat surface and are not usable on those with irregular surfaces. They can be used as a ladder, but they have the advantage of being more comfortable to be able to stand on its wider platform. For small heights they are safer than a normal ladder. However, they have the disadvantage of being less stable than a "normal ladder resting on the wall" so care should be taken when using a high step stool (or folding ladder) instead of a normal ladder placed against the wall, because with an imbalance it could tip over, someone holding it would be advisable.

Gallery

See also
 Monks bench
Folding chair
Step chair
Ladder

References

External links 

“escabeau” - Collins French-English Dictionary

Chairs
Stairs